The Koryak constituency (No.217) was a Russian legislative constituency in the Koryak Autonomous Okrug in 1993-2007. In 2007 Koryak AO was merged with Kamchatka Oblast, so currently the territory of former Koryak constituency is now a part of Kamchatka constituency of Kamchatka Krai.

Members elected

Election results

1993

|-
! colspan=2 style="background-color:#E9E9E9;text-align:left;vertical-align:top;" |Candidate
! style="background-color:#E9E9E9;text-align:left;vertical-align:top;" |Party
! style="background-color:#E9E9E9;text-align:right;" |Votes
! style="background-color:#E9E9E9;text-align:right;" |%
|-
|style="background-color:"|
|align=left|Mikhail Popov
|align=left|Independent
|
|14.65%
|-
| colspan="5" style="background-color:#E9E9E9;"|
|- style="font-weight:bold"
| colspan="3" style="text-align:left;" | Total
| 
| 100%
|-
| colspan="5" style="background-color:#E9E9E9;"|
|- style="font-weight:bold"
| colspan="4" |Source:
|
|}

1995

|-
! colspan=2 style="background-color:#E9E9E9;text-align:left;vertical-align:top;" |Candidate
! style="background-color:#E9E9E9;text-align:left;vertical-align:top;" |Party
! style="background-color:#E9E9E9;text-align:right;" |Votes
! style="background-color:#E9E9E9;text-align:right;" |%
|-
|style="background-color:"|
|align=left|Grigory Oynvid
|align=left|Independent
|
|18.00%
|-
|style="background-color:"|
|align=left|Vladimir Mizinin
|align=left|Independent
|
|12.24%
|-
|style="background-color:"|
|align=left|Viktor Limonov
|align=left|Independent
|
|10.63%
|-
|style="background-color:"|
|align=left|Yevgeny Kotlyarov
|align=left|Independent
|
|8.27%
|-
|style="background-color:"|
|align=left|Aleksandr Denisov
|align=left|Independent
|
|6.98%
|-
|style="background-color:"|
|align=left|Aleksandr Leginov
|align=left|Independent
|
|4.63%
|-
|style="background-color:"|
|align=left|Mikhail Popov (incumbent)
|align=left|Independent
|
|3.72%
|-
|style="background-color:"|
|align=left|Anatoly Bachish
|align=left|Liberal Democratic Party
|
|3.65%
|-
|style="background-color:"|
|align=left|Marat Abdeyev
|align=left|Independent
|
|3.55%
|-
|style="background-color:"|
|align=left|Igor Ankhani
|align=left|Independent
|
|3.49%
|-
|style="background-color:"|
|align=left|Gennady Stepanov
|align=left|Independent
|
|2.67%
|-
|style="background-color:"|
|align=left|Yury Neverov
|align=left|Independent
|
|1.93%
|-
|style="background-color:"|
|align=left|Vladimir Kuznetsov
|align=left|Independent
|
|1.22%
|-
|style="background-color:"|
|align=left|Aleksey Vlasov
|align=left|Independent
|
|0.99%
|-
|style="background-color:#000000"|
|colspan=2 |against all
|
|16.13%
|-
| colspan="5" style="background-color:#E9E9E9;"|
|- style="font-weight:bold"
| colspan="3" style="text-align:left;" | Total
| 
| 100%
|-
| colspan="5" style="background-color:#E9E9E9;"|
|- style="font-weight:bold"
| colspan="4" |Source:
|
|}

1999

|-
! colspan=2 style="background-color:#E9E9E9;text-align:left;vertical-align:top;" |Candidate
! style="background-color:#E9E9E9;text-align:left;vertical-align:top;" |Party
! style="background-color:#E9E9E9;text-align:right;" |Votes
! style="background-color:#E9E9E9;text-align:right;" |%
|-
|style="background-color:"|
|align=left|Rafael Gimalov
|align=left|Independent
|
|38.05%
|-
|style="background-color:"|
|align=left|Sergey Leushkin
|align=left|Independent
|
|11.57%
|-
|style="background-color:"|
|align=left|Nina Solodyakova
|align=left|Independent
|
|9.93%
|-
|style="background-color:"|
|align=left|Grigory Oynvid (incumbent)
|align=left|Independent
|
|7.80%
|-
|style="background-color:"|
|align=left|Mikhail Glubokovsky
|align=left|Yabloko
|
|6.88%
|-
|style="background-color:"|
|align=left|Sergey Klemantovich
|align=left|Independent
|
|5.64%
|-
|style="background-color:"|
|align=left|Yevgeny Mel
|align=left|Independent
|
|4.53%
|-
|style="background-color:"|
|align=left|Andrey Semikolennykh
|align=left|Independent
|
|2.67%
|-
|style="background-color:"|
|align=left|Nikolay Moskalev
|align=left|Independent
|
|1.90%
|-
|style="background-color:"|
|align=left|Aleksandr Denisov
|align=left|Independent
|
|0.80%
|-
|style="background-color:"|
|align=left|Vladimir Korchmit
|align=left|Independent
|
|0.74%
|-
|style="background-color:"|
|align=left|Aleksandra Klyuchnikova
|align=left|Independent
|
|0.67%
|-
|style="background-color:"|
|align=left|Ella Oshchepkova
|align=left|Independent
|
|0.32%
|-
|style="background-color:#000000"|
|colspan=2 |against all
|
|6.22%
|-
| colspan="5" style="background-color:#E9E9E9;"|
|- style="font-weight:bold"
| colspan="3" style="text-align:left;" | Total
| 
| 100%
|-
| colspan="5" style="background-color:#E9E9E9;"|
|- style="font-weight:bold"
| colspan="4" |Source:
|
|}

2003

|-
! colspan=2 style="background-color:#E9E9E9;text-align:left;vertical-align:top;" |Candidate
! style="background-color:#E9E9E9;text-align:left;vertical-align:top;" |Party
! style="background-color:#E9E9E9;text-align:right;" |Votes
! style="background-color:#E9E9E9;text-align:right;" |%
|-
|style="background-color:"|
|align=left|Rafael Gimalov (incumbent)
|align=left|Independent
|
|59.83%
|-
|style="background-color:"|
|align=left|Valentina Bronevich
|align=left|Independent
|
|14.75%
|-
|style="background-color:"|
|align=left|Aleksandr Suvorov
|align=left|Communist Party
|
|11.30%
|-
|style="background-color:"|
|align=left|Aleksandr Kaptsevich
|align=left|Independent
|
|2.85%
|-
|style="background-color:#000000"|
|colspan=2 |against all
|
|9.82%
|-
| colspan="5" style="background-color:#E9E9E9;"|
|- style="font-weight:bold"
| colspan="3" style="text-align:left;" | Total
| 
| 100%
|-
| colspan="5" style="background-color:#E9E9E9;"|
|- style="font-weight:bold"
| colspan="4" |Source:
|
|}

References

Obsolete Russian legislative constituencies
Politics of the Koryak Autonomous Okrug